The Kana is a river in the southwestern part on the Kola Peninsula, Murmansk Oblast, Russia. The Kana is a tributary to the Umba. It has its sources in the forests southeast of Lake Imandra, about 25 km south of the town of Apatity. From there it flows in a southeasterly direction, through a largely uninhabited landscape dominated by forests and bogs. Its outlet is at the northern end of Lake Kanozero on the Umba River.

References

 

Rivers of Murmansk Oblast